Azman may refer to:

 Azman, surname and given name
 Azman Air, Nigerian airline